snRNA-activating protein complex subunit 2 is a protein that in humans is encoded by the SNAPC2 gene.

Interactions 
SNAPC2 has been shown to interact with SNAPC4.

References

Further reading